Events from the year 1810 in Denmark.

Incumbents
 Monarch – Frederick VI
 Prime minister – Christian Günther von Bernstorff, Frederik Moltke (from 27 April)

Events
 4 April  The County of Roepstorff is established by Christian Alexander Roepstorff from the manors of Einsidelsborg and Kørup.

Births
 2 May – Hans Christian Lumbye, composer of waltzes, polkas, mazurkas and galops, including the Champagne Galop (died 1874)
 15 May – Orla Lehmann, statesman and key figure in the development of Denmark's parliamentary government (died 1870)
 26 May – Christen Købke, painter (died 1848)
 20 August – Carl Adolph Feilberg, businessman (died 1896)
 19 September – Jens Peter Trap, royal secretary, topographical writer and publisher (died 1885)
 7 October – Peter Faber, songwriter, telegraphy pioneer (died 1877)
 24 December – Wilhelm Marstrand, painter and illustrator (died 1873)

Full date missing
 Thomas Jacobsen, violin maker (died 1950=

Deaths
 22 October – Andreas Kirkerup, architect (born 1749)

References

 
1810s in Denmark
Denmark
Years of the 19th century in Denmark